Esmeralda County is a county in the southwestern portion of the U.S. state of Nevada. As of the 2020 census, the population was 729, making it the least populous county in Nevada. Esmeralda County does not have any incorporated communities. Its county seat is the town of Goldfield.

Its school district does not have a high school, so students in grades 9–12 go to school in Tonopah, in the Nye County School District.

Most residents live in Goldfield or in the town of Dyer in Fish Lake Valley, near the California border. Esmeralda is the only Nevada county in the Los Angeles TV market (or any California market) as defined by The Nielsen Corporation.

History
Esmeralda County is one of the original counties in Nevada, established on November 25, 1861. When it was organized, it comprised the part of the Nevada Territory south of the 39th parallel and east of Mason Valley. Esmeralda is the Spanish and Portuguese word for "emerald". An early California miner from San Jose, James Manning Cory, named the Esmeralda Mining District after Esmeralda the Romani dancer from The Hunchback of Notre-Dame.

Just after the organization of Esmeralda County, the vast majority of the land area had yet to be seen by Euro-American society. John C. Frémont was one of the few people who had explored parts of the county. He had crossed Big Smoky Valley in 1845. Also, Aurora and its northern corridor had been encountered. In 1862 and 1863, the area along the Reese River was explored during the Reese River excitement. The event resulted in the establishment of three mining districts in the Toiyabe Range, namely Marysville, Twin River, and Washington, and the establishment of a number of settlements and ranches in Esmeralda County. Explorers pursued south and explored the Shoshone Mountains. The mining district Union was organized after silver was found in 1863 and the settlement of Ione was founded there.

The total area of Esmeralda County more than halved as Nye County was organized on February 16, 1864. That county was entirely created out of land that used to be part of Esmeralda County. Esmeralda has had three county seats: Aurora until 1883, Hawthorne from 1883 to 1907 and finally Goldfield.  At one point, due to the disputed border with California, Aurora was simultaneously the county seat of both Mono County, California and Esmeralda County.  Samuel Clemens (Mark Twain) wrote about his time as a miner in the Esmeralda District in his book Roughing It.

Esmeralda grew from a gold mining boom in the first years of the 20th century. The mines were largely tapped out by the end of the 1910s and the economy and population declined afterwards.

Geography

It is the fourth-smallest county in Nevada by area. A very small part of Death Valley National Park lies in its southeast corner.

The county is dominated by the Silver Peak and Monte Cristo mountain ranges.  Mountains in the county include:
 Boundary Peak, 13,147 feet (4,007 m), the highest natural point in Nevada
 Piper Peak, 9450 feet (2,880 m), the most prominent peak in Esmeralda County
 Magruder Mountain 9044 feet (2,756 m)
 Montezuma Peak, 8373 feet (2,552 m)
 Emigrant Peak, 6790 feet (2,069 m)

Highways

  Interstate 11 (Future)
  U.S. Route 6
  U.S. Route 95
  State Route 264
  State Route 265
  State Route 266
  State Route 267
  State Route 773
  State Route 774

Adjacent counties

 Mineral County - northwest
 Nye County - east
 Inyo County, California - south
 Mono County, California - west

National protected areas
 Death Valley National Park (part)
 Inyo National Forest (part)
Boundary Peak Wilderness

Demographics

2000 census
At the 2000 census there were 971 people, 455 households, and 259 families living in the county.  The population density was 0 people per square mile (0/km2).  There were 833 housing units at an average density of 0 per square mile (0/km2).  The racial makeup of the county was 81.98% White, 0.10% Black or African American, 5.15% Native American, 0.21% Pacific Islander, 7.62% from other races, and 4.94% from two or more races.  10.20% of the population were Hispanic or Latino of any race.
Of the 455 households 21.10% had children under the age of 18 living with them, 46.40% were married couples living together, 6.40% had a female householder with no husband present, and 42.90% were non-families. 36.00% of households were one person and 13.20% were one person aged 65 or older.  The average household size was 2.12 and the average family size was 2.79.

The age distribution was 20.50% under the age of 18, 6.00% from 18 to 24, 23.40% from 25 to 44, 33.00% from 45 to 64, and 17.20% 65 or older.  The median age was 45 years. For every 100 females, there were 123.70 males.  For every 100 females age 18 and over, there were 118.70 males.

The median household income was $33,203 and the median family income  was $40,917. Males had a median income of $39,327 versus $25,469 for females. The per capita income for the county was $18,971.  15.30% of the population and 7.50% of families were below the poverty line.  Out of the total people living in poverty, 9.70% are under the age of 18 and 11.40% are 65 or older.

2010 census
At the 2010 census, there were 783 people, 389 households, and 213 families living in the county. The racial makeup of the county was 84.4% white, 4.2% American Indian, 0.4% Asian, 6.6% from other races, and 4.3% from two or more races. Those of Hispanic or Latino origin made up 15.3% of the population. In terms of ancestry, 26.7% were German, 18.6% were English, 14.0% were American, 13.8% were Irish, and 8.7% were Swedish.

Of the 389 households, 18.3% had children under the age of 18 living with them, 43.4% were married couples living together, 5.9% had a female householder with no husband present, 45.2% were non-families, and 40.6% of households were made up of individuals. The average household size was 2.01 and the average family size was 2.67. The median age was 52.9 years.

The median household income was $39,712 and the median family income  was $57,292. Males had a median income of $41,023 versus $27,019 for females. The per capita income for the county was $34,571. About 6.7% of families and 11.2% of the population were below the poverty line, including 9.8% of those under age 18 and 9.4% of those age 65 or over.

Law and government
The county seat of Esmeralda County is Goldfield since May 1, 1907. The courthouse was opened on May 1, 1908, and has been in continuous use since then. Currently, the Offices of the Assessor, Auditor/Recorder, District Attorney, Sheriff/Jail, Justice of the Peace, Treasurer, District Court, and Commissioner are located in the building.

Politics

Education
The Esmeralda County School District has three elementary schools that currently serve approximately 90 students.

As of 2022 it sends its high school students to Tonopah High School of Nye County School District.

Communities

Census-designated places 
 Dyer
 Goldfield (county seat)
 Silver Peak

Ghost towns

 Alkali
 Arlemont
 Blair
 Blair Junction
 Coaldale
 Columbus
 Fish Lake Nevada
 Gilbert
 Gold Point
 Lida
 McLeans
 Millers
 Palmetto

See also

 National Register of Historic Places listings in Esmeralda County, Nevada
 USS Esmeraldo County (LST-761)

References

External links

 
 Esmeralda County School District
 Aurora, Esmeralda County, Nevada Collection. Western Americana Collection, Beinecke Rare Book and Manuscript Library.

 
1861 establishments in Nevada Territory
Populated places established in 1861